Condate angulina is a moth in the family Erebidae. It is found in Asia, with records from India, Bangladesh, Malaysia, Taiwan, Borneo, and Thailand. It is a small moth, though larger than its congeners.

References

Boletobiinae
Moths of Asia
Moths of Malaysia
Moths of Taiwan
Moths of Borneo
Taxa named by Achille Guenée
Moths described in 1852